Mileham is a surname. Notable people with the surname include:

Harry Mileham (1873–1957), British artist
Kevin Mileham (born 1971), South African politician
Lacy Barnes-Mileham (born 1964), American discus thrower
Matthew Mileham (born 1956), British hammer thrower

Surnames
English-language surnames
Surnames of English origin
Surnames of British Isles origin